

Kangaroo Head  is a locality in the  Australian state  of  South Australia located on the north coast of Dudley Peninsula on Kangaroo Island overlooking both Backstairs Passage and Nepean Bay about  south of the state capital of Adelaide.

Its boundaries were created in March 2002 for the “long established name” which is derived from Kangaroo Head, a headland located within the locality.

As of 2015, Kangaroo Head consists generally of a strip of land located between the Hog Bay Road and the coastline with Backstairs Passage and Nepean Bay.  The majority land use in the locality is agriculture.

Kangaroo Head is located within the federal division of Mayo, the state electoral district of Mawson and the local government area of the Kangaroo Island Council.

See also
Kangaroo (disambiguation)

References
Notes

Citations

Towns on Kangaroo Island
Dudley Peninsula